Mudug is an administrative region (gobol) in north-central Somalia. The population of Mudug is 131,455 as of 2005.

Overview
Physiographically, Mudug is bordered to the west by Ethiopia, to the north and south by the Somali regions of Nugal and Galguduud respectively, and to the east by the Indian Ocean. The provincial capital is Galkayo.

The southern half of Mudug and the region of Galgaduud have formed the Galmudug State, which considers itself an autonomous state within the larger Federal Republic of Somalia, as defined by the provisional constitution of Somalia.

Districts
Mudug Region consists of five districts:

 Galdogob District
 Galkayo District*
 Harardhere District*
 Hobyo District*
 Jariban District

Note:
* - part of Galmudug

Villages
 

Dajimale
El Dinouda Digdighei
Maygag Qabcalle, an unpopulated locality

Notes

External links
Administrative map of Mudug
Somalia: Information on the clans in control of Galcayo, Gelinsoor and Hobyo and on current conditions in these areas, 1 April 1996

 
 
Regions of Somalia